The team jumping in equestrian at the 2016 Summer Olympics in Rio de Janeiro was held at National Equestrian Center on 14, 16 and 17 August.

The medals were presented by Camiel Eurlings, IOC member, The Netherlands and Ingmar De Vos, President of the FEI.

Competition format
Five rounds of jumping were conducted in total. The second and third rounds were used for the team jumping event. Final rankings were based on the sum of scores of the three best riders from both rounds. A jump-off was held to break a tie for the bronze medal position.

Schedule
All times are Brasília Time (UTC–3)

Results

References

Team jumping